In early July 1927, the Ohio Department of Highways implemented the system of United States Numbered Highways that had been approved by the states in late 1926. This resulted in the renumbering of many of the state highways to avoid overlaps with the new U.S. Routes and numbers used by both classes of route. In addition to the U.S. Routes, a new State Route 6 was formed, extending West Virginia Route 6 northwest from the Ohio River at Bridgeport to Norwalk. (Route 6 later became U.S. Route 250 in both states.)

A number of State Routes - 1, 10, 13, 15, 16, 31, 49, 95, 112, 124, 130, 160, 180 , and 223 - were entirely replaced by U.S. Routes or the new State Route 6. The numbers 6, 20, 21, 22, 23, 24, 25, 27, 30, 40, 42, 50, 52, and 127 conflicted with new designations, so the State Routes with those numbers were renamed. Some others - 28, 48, 63, 125, 126, 129, 142, and 263 - were replaced by extensions of other State Routes or new State Routes where not part of a U.S. Route. State Routes 102 and 249 became portions of other routes, but the numbers were reused in the immediate vicinity, 102 for the old alignment of 2 and 249 as part of a three-way route alignment swap in the immediate vicinity. The numbers freed up were reused on other routes.

Later renumberings due to U.S. Routes

State Route 250 was renumbered as State Route 226 when U.S. Route 250 was created in 1928 over State Route 6.
State Route 223 was renumbered as State Route 283 when U.S. Route 223 was created in Ohio in 1930 over U.S. Route 127, which was rerouted over part of State Route 108 (see below), and most of State Route 9 (The rest of which became part of State Route 15).
US 22 extended to Cincinnati over State Route 10 in 1931.
State Route 6 was renumbered as State Route 283, and State Route 283 was renumbered as State Route 326 when U.S. Route 6 extended into Ohio in 1932 over part of State Route 167, part of State Route 7, part of State Route 85, part of State Route 2, part of State Route 34, and more of State Route 2 (which was rerouted over the former State Route 108 in 1935) to Indiana.
State Route 36 was renumbered as State Route 5 when U.S. Route 36 extended into Ohio in 1932 over all of State Route 200, part of State Route 29, part of State Route 55, following State Route 4, part of State Route 32, following State Route 37 (47 until 1932), following State Route 3, part of State Route 95, part of State Route 16, and part of US 250. State Route 5 was transferred to US 30N (later the new alignment of US 30) (note that US 30S (old alignment of US 30) is now State Route 309).
State Route 62 was renumbered as State Route 19 when U.S. Route 62 extended into Ohio in 1932 over part of State Route 38 to Washington Court House, following State Route 3, and all of State Route 19.
State Route 68 was renumbered as State Route 47 when U.S. Route 68 extended into Ohio in 1933 over all of State Route 10 which overlapped the following (these overlaps were removed): all of State Route 221, part of State Route 53 (the southernmost section (separated by US 68) was renumbered as State Route 221), part of State Route 31, and part of US 25.
State Route 224 was renumbered as State Route 177 when U.S. Route 224 was created in 1933 over State Route 17.
State Route 35 was renumbered as State Route 9 when U.S. Route 35 was created in 1934 over State Route 11 (which was eliminated the next year).
State Route 33 was renumbered as State Route 108 when U.S. Route 33 was created in 1937 over part of State Route 54, most of State Route 32 (the remainder became part of State Route 54, but this section became part of State Route 29 by 1939), and part of State Route 31.

References
Ohio Department of Transportation, Ohio Transportation Maps, particularly the 1926 and 1927 maps

 Renumbering 1927
Ohio State Highway Renumbering, 1927
State Highway Renumbering, 1927
History of Ohio
Highway renumbering in the United States